Charon grayi, the giant whip-spider, is a species of whip spider found in Malaysia, Singapore, Philippines, Indonesia, Papua New Guinea, the Solomon Islands and Palau. This whip-spider usually lives in caves.

References
 Gervais, 1842 : Entomologie. L'Institut, Journal Universel des Sciences et des Sociétés Savantes en France et a l'Étranger, 1ere Section, vol. 10, p. 76.

External links
 Biolib
 Indonesian Cave Life
 EoL

Amblypygi
Invertebrates of Malaysia
Arthropods of the Philippines
Cave arachnids
Animals described in 1842